The islands of Sturkö and Tjurkö form the Sturkö Parish of the Eastern Hundred, Karlskrona Municipality, Blekinge, Sweden.

Islands of Blekinge County